Ling Ling Chang (born July 24, 1976) is an American politician who formerly served in the California State Senate, representing the 29th district, encompassing parts of Los Angeles, Orange, and San Bernardino counties. Prior to being elected to the state Senate, she was a Diamond Bar City Councilwoman and a state Assemblywoman for the 55th district. Chang is a Republican.

In 2016, Chang was a candidate for California's 29th State Senate district, losing the general election very narrowly to Democrat Josh Newman. After Newman was recalled by voters in 2018, Chang won a plurality of votes on the recall ballot and became the state Senator for California's 29th district. Chang narrowly lost re-election to Josh Newman in the 2020 election.

Early life and education
Born in Taiwan, Chang and her family emigrated to the United States when she was three years old. She was raised in Diamond Bar and graduated from Diamond Bar High School. She studied biology at UC Riverside but did not graduate. She was criticized during her 2014 campaign for claims that she attended Harvard University when she was in fact taking online classes through Harvard Extension School, the university's online extension program which is open to the general public.

Career

Chang worked at Strategy Insights Group. In 2005, she was elected to the Walnut Valley Water District Board and was then elected twice to the Diamond Bar City Council.

California State Assembly 

Chang was elected to the California Assembly in the 55th district in 2014 and had five bills signed into law in her first seven months in office. She also proposed bills seeking to cut business regulations.

2016 State Senate run

Chang was the Republican candidate for California's 29th State Senate district in the 2016 election. She ran against two Democrats, former Irvine Mayor Sukhee Kang and veteran Josh Newman to succeed Bob Huff in 2016 due to term limits.

As of October 2016, Chang had raised more than $4 million. She made public comments distancing herself from Republican presidential nominee Donald Trump. In November 2016, with 49.6% of the vote, Chang lost the general election to Democrat Josh Newman.

2018 State Senate special recall election 
On June 5, 2018, Chang won a recall election for the same State Senate seat that she had lost to Josh Newman two years earlier. Newman was targeted for recall by the Republican Party of California in an attempt to break the Democratic super majority in the Senate, though the campaign also emphasized Newman's vote to increase gas and vehicle taxes to fund infrastructure improvements.

2020 State Senate election 
In 2020 Chang lost the election to serve a full term in the State Senate. She lost the 2020 rematch to Josh Newman by a margin about three times larger than she had lost in 2016.

Personal life
Chang is married to Andrew Wong, an attorney.

References

External links 
 
 

American politicians of Taiwanese descent
American women of Taiwanese descent in politics
Asian American and Pacific Islander state legislators in California
California politicians of Chinese descent
Republican Party California state senators
Republican Party members of the California State Assembly
Living people
Taiwanese emigrants to the United States
1976 births
21st-century American politicians
21st-century American women politicians
Women state legislators in California
Harvard Extension School alumni
Asian conservatism in the United States